is an underground railway station on the Minatomirai Line subway in Naka-ku, Yokohama, Kanagawa Prefecture, Japan, operated by the third-sector railway operating company Yokohama Minatomirai Railway Company.

Lines
Motomachi-Chukagai Station is served by the underground Minatomirai Line, and is 4.1 km from the starting point of the line at Yokohama Station. Trains through-run to and from the Tokyu Toyoko Line from Shibuya Station and beyond on the Tokyo Metro Fukutoshin Line and Tobu Tojo Line and Seibu Ikebukuro Line.

Station layout
Motomachi-Chukagai Station is an underground station with a single island platform serving two terminating tracks on the fourth basement ("B4F") level.

Platforms

History
Motomachi-Chukagai Station opened on 1 February 2004, coinciding with the opening of the Minatomirai Line.

Passenger statistics
In fiscal 2011, the station was used by an average of 54,172 passengers daily.

Surrounding area
JR East's Ishikawachō Station, served by the Negishi Line, was renamed "Ishikawachō 'Motomachi-Chūkagai' Station" on 15 September 2016 to alleviate confusion on which Negishi Line station is closest to Motomachi and Yokohama Chinatown. Despite this, the two stations are located relatively far from each other, making transfer impractical.

 Yokohama Chinatown, one of the largest Chinatowns in the world with over 500 shops and restaurants. Exit from the Chūkagai Exit of the station.
 Motomachi Shopping Street, a fashionable shopping street, with stores carrying original style clothing and shoes, foreign imports, and European goods. Exit from the Motomachi Exit of the station.
 Yamate and Bluff areas, a historic neighborhood with many old foreign residences. Exit from the Motomachi Exit of the station, and walk east up the hill.
 Yokohama Marine Tower, the tallest lighthouse in the world. Exit from the Marine Tower Exit of the station, and walk north.
 Yamashita Park, a park facing Yokohama Harbor. Exit from the Yamashita Park Exit of the station, and walk north towards the ocean.
 Hotel New Grand, one of the oldest hotels in Yokohama. Exit from the Yamashita Park Exit of the station, and walk north.

See also
 List of railway stations in Japan

References

External links

  

Naka-ku, Yokohama
Railway stations in Kanagawa Prefecture
Railway stations in Yokohama
Railway stations in Japan opened in 2004